Death on Credit (US translation: Death on the Installment Plan) is a novel by author Louis-Ferdinand Céline, published in 1936. The most common, and generally most respected English translation is Ralph Manheim's.

Contents
In Death on Credit, Ferdinand Bardamu, former Céline alter ego in Journey to the End of the Night - of which it is a sort of prequel - is a doctor in Paris, treating the poor who seldom pay him but take every advantage of his availability. The action is not continuous but goes back in time to earlier memories and often moves into fantasy, especially in Ferdinand's sexual escapades; the style becomes deliberately rougher and sentences become terser to emulate everyday Parisian tragedies: struggles to make a living, illness, venereal disease, the stories of families whose destiny is governed by their own stupidity, malice, lust and greed.

Céline brings to life in this novel an impressive gallery of failures and misfits, including Father Gorloge, Mr. Merrywin, not forgetting the author's parents, and in particular the inventor Roger-Marin Courtial des Pereires and his wife. Perhaps the most memorable character in Céline's work (after Ferdinand Bardamu and the author's other alter egos), Courtial, an extravagant but universal scholar - and a figure at the same time brilliant and grotesque - is inspired by Raoul Marquis (better known as Henry de Graffigny), whom Céline met at the end of World War I, when both were hired by the Rockefeller Foundation and traveled together to Brittany for the campaign against tuberculosis.

In popular culture
The novel is referenced in the autobiographical first chapter of Kurt Vonnegut's Slaughterhouse-Five as well as Anthony Swofford's Jarhead.

In the 1998 film Wild Things, the character of Suzie Marie Toller (Neve Campbell) is encountered by the police while reading a paperback edition of Death on the Installment Plan—a subtle indication of the attitude of the character and her role in the plot.

References

1936 French novels
Novels by Louis-Ferdinand Céline
Novels set in Paris